Stanley Buchholz Kimball (November 25, 1926 – May 15, 2003) was a historian at Southern Illinois University.  He was an expert on eastern European history and also wrote on Latter-day Saint history, including his ancestor Heber C. Kimball and the Mormon Trail.

Biography
Kimball was raised in Farmington, Utah, until he was in junior high school when he moved to Denver, Colorado.

During World War II Kimball served briefly with the United States Army Air Forces at Sheppard Field, Texas.

As a member of the Church of Jesus Christ of Latter-day Saints (LDS Church), Kimball served as a missionary in Czechoslovakia starting in 1948.  When the missionaries were expelled from the country in 1950, he was relocated to England with Stayner Richards as his mission president.

Kimball returned home and completed his B.A. and M.A. from the University of Denver.  Kimball then became a director of an art center in Winston-Salem, North Carolina.  While living in Winston-Salem he married Violet Tew, with whom he would have four children.  He then went to Columbia University where he earned a Ph.D. in history, doing his dissertation on the Czech National Theatre in America.

In 1959, Kimball settled in the St. Louis, Missouri area and began teaching at Southern Illinois University Edwardsville (SIUE).  He would teach there for 41 years, until his 2001 retirement.  Before SIUE, he taught as a student or during summers at schools such as Columbia University, College of the City of New York, Brigham Young University, and Washington University in St. Louis.

After retirement, Kimball moved to St. George, Utah for medical reasons.  Two years later, in 2003, Kimball died of cancer at the age of 76.

Honors
 1981 Best Book Award from the Mormon History Association for Heber C. Kimball: Mormon Patriarch and Pioneer.
 1982 Special commendation from the National Park Service for his work on the Mormon Pioneer Historic Trail.
 1984 President of the Mormon History Association.
 1991 Grace Fort Arrington Award for historical excellence from the Mormon History Association.

Writings

Books

Articles

Notes

Sources
Mormon Historic Sites foundation interview with Kimball
Deseret News article on Kimball's death

External links 
 
 
 Heber C. Kimball biography listed by the University of Illinois Press
 Stanley B. Kimball Sources of Mormon History in Illinois—digitized pdf of Sources of Mormon history in Illinois, 1839-48: an annotated catalog of the microfilm collection at Southern Illinois University compiled by Kimball, accompanied by a biography of Kimball.

1926 births
2003 deaths
20th-century Mormon missionaries
Latter Day Saints from Utah
United States Army personnel of World War II
American Mormon missionaries in Czechoslovakia
American Mormon missionaries in England
Brigham Young University faculty
Deaths from cancer in Utah
Columbia Graduate School of Arts and Sciences alumni
Historians of the American West
Historians of Europe
Historians of the Latter Day Saint movement
People from Farmington, Utah
Southern Illinois University Edwardsville faculty
United States Army Air Forces soldiers
University of Denver alumni
Latter Day Saints from Colorado
Latter Day Saints from Illinois